is a Japanese writer of crime fiction and thrillers. She is a member of the Mystery Writers of Japan and the Honkaku Mystery Writers Club of Japan. She is a 2015 recipient of the Alex Awards.

Life 
She started writing in her thirties. Her first novel Confessions became a bestseller and won the Japanese Booksellers Award.

In youth she was an avid fan of mystery novels of Edogawa Ranpo, Maurice Leblanc, Agatha Christie, Keigo Higashino, Miyuki Miyabe and Yukito Ayatsuji.

She has been described in Japan as "the queen of iyamisu." Iyamisu (eww mystery) is a subgenre of mystery fiction which deals with grisly episodes and the dark side of human nature. Readers blurt out "eww" when they are reading iyamisu novels. The term was created in 2006 by the mystery critic Aoi Shimotsuki. There has been an iyamisu boom in Japan since around 2012. Kanae Minato, Mahokaru Numata and Yukiko Mari are regarded as representatives of the genre in Japan. The back cover blurb of the Japanese edition of Gone Girl, published in June 2013, was "One of the best iyamisu novels from overseas."

The English edition of Minato's Confessions, published in August 2014, was described by a critic as "the Gone Girl of Japan."

Wall Street Journal selected Confessions as one of the 10 best mysteries of 2014.

Works in English translation
Confessions (original title: Kokuhaku), trans. Stephen Snyder (Mulholland Books, 2014) , 
Penance (original title: Shokuzai), trans. Philip Gabriel (Mulholland Books, 2017) ,

Awards and nominations
Japanese Awards
 2007 – Shosetsu Suiri New Writers Prize: "The Saint" (The first chapter of her novel Confessions)
 2009 – Japanese Booksellers Award: Confessions
 2012 – Mystery Writers of Japan Award for Best Short Story: "Umi no Hoshi"

U.S. Awards
 2015 – Alex Award: Confessions
 2015 – Nominee for Strand Critics Award for Best First Novel: Confessions
 2015 – Nominee for Shirley Jackson Award for Best Novel: Confessions

Bibliography

Standalone novels
 , 2008 (Confessions)
 , 2009 (Girls)
 , 2009 (Expiation)
 , 2010 (For N)
 , 2010 (The Night Ferris Wheel)
 , 2011 (The Chain of Flowers)
 , 2011 (Circumstances)
 , 2012 (The Snow White Murder Case)
 , 2012 (Motherhood)
 , 2013 (An Entrance Examination for a  High School)
 , 2014 (Sleep on a Bean)
 , 2014 (Mountain Woman Diary)
 , 2014 (The End of the Story)
 , 2015
, 2015 (Reverse)
, 2015
, 2018 (Future) 
, 2018
, 2019 (Sunset)
, 2020 (Fragment)

Short story collections
 , 2010 (Round Trip Letter)
 , 2012 (Sapphire)
 , 2013 (Thoughts of Home)
, 2016

TV and film adaptations
Japanese films
 Confessions (2010)
 Kita no Kanaria tachi (2012) (Based on her short story Niju nen go no Shukudai 二十年後の宿題)
 The Snow White Murder Case (Shirayukihime Satsujin Jiken) (2014)
 Night's Tightrope (Shōjo) (2016)
 Bokyo (Based on her short story “夢の国 Yume no Kuni” Dreamland and “光の航 Hikari no koro” Light Route)(2017)
 Motherhood (2022)

Japanese TV Movies and Series 
 Kyōgū (TV Movie) (2011) 
 Penance (2012) (Shokuzai)
 Kōkō Nyūshi (TV Series) (2012)
 Yakō Kanransha (TV Series) (2013)
 Hana no Kusari (TV Movie) (2013)
 N no Tame ni (TV Series) (2014)
 Josei Sakka Mysteries Utsukushiki Mitsu no Uso (TV Movie 女性作家ミステリーズ 美しき三つの嘘 Only Episode 1 Based on her short story “Moonstone” from short story “Sapphire”) (2016)
 Bokyo TV Movie Special (Based on her short story “みかんの花 Mikan no hana” Orange Flowers, “海の星 Umi no hoshi” Sea Stars and “雲の糸 Kumo no ito” Cloud Thread)(2016)
 Ōfuku shokan ~ Junen go-nen-go no hōshu (TV Movie Based on her short story 往復書簡～十五年後の補習) (2016)
  Yamaonna Nikki ~ Onnatachi wa itadaki wo mezashite (TV Series 山女日記 ～女たちは頂きを目指して～) (2016)
 Reverse (TV Series)  (2017)
 Poison Daughter Holy Mother (TV Series)  (2019)
 Lupin the 3rd Part 6 (TV Anime Series) (2021)

See also

Japanese detective fiction

References
 Profile at J'Lit Books from Japan 
 Profile and the synopsis of Confessions at Mulholland Books

1973 births
20th-century Japanese novelists
21st-century Japanese novelists
Japanese women short story writers
Japanese mystery writers
Japanese crime fiction writers
Mystery Writers of Japan Award winners
Japanese screenwriters
Women mystery writers
Japanese women novelists
Living people
Writers from Hiroshima Prefecture
21st-century Japanese women writers
21st-century Japanese writers
20th-century Japanese women writers
20th-century Japanese short story writers
21st-century Japanese short story writers